The 1991 Diet Sarsi Sizzlers season was the second season of the franchise in the Philippine Basketball Association (PBA). The team was known as Swift Mighty Meaty Hotdogs in the Third Conference.

Occurrences
Sizzlers' former import Lewis Lloyd replaces Kenny Sanders after Diet Sarsi lost their first game, 83-98 to Presto Tivoli. Lloyd played two games and led his team to one victory before getting injured and was replaced by Bernard Thompson.

On April 14, the Sizzlers signed up Purefoods' back-up center Jack Tanuan, whose contract with the Hotdogs expired a week before.

The PBA office fined the RFM franchise P50,000 and Purefoods forward Alvin Patrimonio P10,000 for tampering a contract.

Beginning the Third Conference, Diet Sarsi change its team name to Swift Mighty Meaty Hotdogs, a brand the RFM Company has been carrying during their amateur days.

Notable dates
March 7: Diet Sarsi snapped a four-game winning run of erstwhile unbeaten Purefoods in a 103-96 win. Al Solis, a former hotdogs who played a big role in their last year's title-conquest, hit a jumper off a foul by Elmer Reyes and completed a three-point play to give Sarsi a six-point cushion with 2:39 left in the game. 

July 4: The Sizzlers raise their won-loss record to six wins and one defeat and on top of the standings in the All-Filipino Conference, dealing Purefoods its first loss in five games by winning over the Tender Juicy Hotdogs, 102-98. 

July 14: Al Solis pumped-in a running shot that banked off the board and went in to lift Diet Sarsi to a 105-104 triumph over San Miguel Beermen. Solis had taken possession at midcourt from Yoyoy Villamin who was hounded by Romy Lopez at the baseline. Then the Sarsi guard, who was still 25 meters from the goal, dribbled past Renato Agustin and heaved that shot from about 23 feet, erasing a 102-104 deficit and giving them their seventh win in nine games. Solis' last-second three-pointer spoiled a career-high 44-point production by Beermen' Ato Agustin. San Miguel put the game under protest as coach Norman Black contested that the clock didn't move when Solis received the inbound pass, but the Beermen later decided not to file a protest and accepted their second loss from the Sizzlers.

Runner-up finish
In only their fifth conference so far, Diet Sarsi makes it to the finals for the first time. The Sizzlers defeated San Miguel Beermen, 100-95, in a playoff game on August 20 as they'll face corporate rival Purefoods for the All-Filipino crown.

The Sizzlers took a 2-1 series lead and a win away from winning their first title, the Tender Juicy Hotdogs came back to win the last two games to finally ended their frustrations on winning the elusive All-Filipino championship.

Roster

Transactions

Trades

Additions

Subtractions

Recruited imports

References

Pop Cola Panthers seasons
Diet